Susanne Schädlich (born 29 November 1965) is a German writer and literary translator. She is also experienced as a "ghost writer".

The daughter of a high-profile East German dissident intellectual, she came to wider prominence with her 2009 book "Immer wieder Dezember. Der Westen, die Stasi, der Onkel und ich" (loosely "December, always December. The west, the Stasi, the uncle and I") in which she tells the story of her childhood in the two Germanies during the Cold War, and the impact of discovering that her trusted and loved uncle (who later killed himself on a Berlin park bench) had been spying on her family through much of her childhood in order to report on them to the widely detested Ministry for State Security apparatus (Stasi).

Early life and education
Susanne Schädlich was born in Jena, in the southern part of the  German Democratic Republic (East Germany). The family relocated while she was still small. Until December 1977, she and her younger sister Anna grew up with their parents in Köpenick, a quarter near the centre of East Berlin. Hans Joachim Schädlich, her father, is an author. Her mother, born Krista Maria Hübner, worked as a publisher's editor. Susanne Schädlich's maternal grandfather, Arno Hübner, was a university law professor.

During the 1970s her father, was establishing himself as an East German writer. The authorities found his first novel unacceptably critical of the regime. In order to get it published he had to smuggle it across into West Germany. Its publication in Hamburg instantly turned Hans Joachim Schädlich into a public enemy ("Staatsfeind"). His East German publishing contract was abruptly terminated and he lost his job with the (East) German Academy of Sciences and Humanities. He was even prevented from working as a taxi driver. He was threatened with imprisonment.   However, his friendship with the well-known West German author Günter Grass led to concerns that his imprisonment might trigger criticism of the East German government in the west. Instead of setting up a show trial for Schädlich, in December 1977 the authorities let him know that he might – and indeed should – leave the country. Five days later Susanne Schädlich and her family relocated to West Germany, where they settled, initially, in Hamburg. Later she moved on to West Berlin. Susanne Schädlich was twelve at this time. She was aware in general terms of the problems her parents were having with the authorities, and although they assumed their telephone was bugged and that they were under some level of surveillance, Hans Joachim and Krista Maria Schädlich still discussed the issues of the day in the presence of their children. Her father had been one of those who had been so enraged by the unjust treatment of Wolf Biermann the previous year that he had signed the petition objecting to Biermann being stripped of his citizenship. Although she was surprised at the speed of the family's expulsion to the west when it happened, the cause of it was clear to her even at the time. 

It took some time for Schädlich to settle in the west. In the 1970s an easterner attending a school in Hamburg was unusual. At home the East German Ministry for States Security (Stasi) did not leave the family alone. There were, according to Schädlich, attempts to kidnap her father and force him back over to the east. Her father developed psychological problems and her parents split up. Only when she moved to West Berlin where her father was living from 1979, did she begin to feel "at home in the west". In 1985, when she was trying without success to find a teaching job in the west, her uncle found her an apprenticeship in clothes manufacturing in East Berlin. She went for an interview and found herself ending up in an office of the Ministry for State Security (MfS) where she was urged to renounce her West German citizenship. Realising in time that she was in danger of being trapped again behind the wall Schädlich turned down the job and hastened back to the west. It would be another seven years before she joined the dots and realised that there had been more to Uncle Karlheinz's's support with her search for work than she had understood at the time. 

During Schädlich's childhood Uncle Karlheinz was "always there". Karlheinz was slightly more than four years older than her father.  Uncle Karlheinz had "great presence". He was a philanderer and a historian. He spoke English "better than Queen Elizabeth". He smoked British tobacco and dressed in tweed. He flirted shamelessly with younger women and would stay chatting in the Schädlich 's apartment till late into the night. His great hero was Kim Philby, a British intelligence agent who had betrayed hundreds of western spies to Soviet intelligence. In 1992, slightly more than two years after the wall fell, Hans Joachim Schädlich, researching "his" files in the recently opened up Stasi archives, discovered that for more than ten years his brother had been spying on his family and friends. Uncle Karlheinz's award-winning career as a Stasi as a "Inoffizieller Mitarbeiter" (IM) had begun in 1974 with the betrayal of a young man planning to escape to the west, who had in consequence been arrested and sentenced to a prison term.   The most famous target of Uncle Karlheinz's espionage had been his brother's friend Günter Grass.

Career
Shortly before her uncle's unmasking Schädlich moved to the United States for a stay that, in the end, lasted eleven years.   Distance did nothing to soften for her the lasting shock which hit all the family members, that inz Schädlich's spying on family and friends nevertheless came as a complete surprise to his three younger siblings and their families. Schädlich settled in Los Angeles where she took a succession of jobs over the next few years. This enabled her to perfect her English to the point at which she was able to publish her first literary translations. One of the places at which she worked during her time in America was at the Max Kade Institute for Austrian-German-Swiss Studies in Los Angeles, where she was an academic researcher. In 1996 she obtained a bursary from the University of Southern California which enabled her to study modern German philology. She returned to Germany in 1999 and has lived in Berlin since then, undertaking regular assignments in the United States.

Although the shock of her father's discoveries about Karlheinz Schädlich's betrayals was enduring, it was only after her uncle stuck a revolver in his mouth while sitting on a part bench in Berlin and killed himself at the end of 2007 that she felt compelled to record the whole affair in an autobiographical work which was published in 2008/9 as "Immer wieder Dezember. Der Westen, die Stasi, der Onkel und ich" (loosely "December, always December.  The west, the Stasi, the uncle and I").

Books
"Immer wieder Dezember. Der Westen, die Stasi, der Onkel und ich"
"Herr Hübner und die sibirische Nachtigall" ("Dietrich Hübner and the Siberian Nightingale") 2014  "documentary-novel", in which the eponymous protagonist shares her mother's maiden name.
"Briefe ohne Unterschrift": Wie eine BBC-Sendung die DDR herausforderte, 2017

Recent awards (selection)

References 

Writers from Hamburg
People from Treptow-Köpenick
21st-century German novelists
English–German translators
Writers from Berlin
1965 births
Living people
21st-century translators